Gwynt y Môr (Welsh: meaning sea wind) is a 576-megawatt (MW) offshore wind farm located off the coast of Wales and is the fifth largest operating offshore windfarm in the world. The farm has 160 wind turbines of  tip height above mean sea level.

Planning consent for the project was granted on 3 December 2008. The project has a value of 2 billion Euros, of which 1.2 billion Euros were spent on turbines and electrical connections. Construction began in 2012, power production started in September 2013, construction phase ended in November 2014, and final commissioning occurred in June 2015.

In May 2020 plans to add up to 107 new turbines were submitted to Flintshire Council, increasing the windfarm by an extra 41 square miles, with a generating capacity of at least 100 megawatts.

Design and planning
As with all offshore wind farms in the UK the Crown Estate owns the seabed at Gwynt y Môr. It has agreed to lease the land to RWE npower renewables. The wind farm is located close to the existing North Hoyle and Rhyl Flats offshore wind farms. These projects are wholly or partly owned by RWE npower renewables, a subsidiary of German company RWE. In the case of Gwynt y Môr, RWE holds 50%, Stadtwerke München holds 30%, Siemens holds 10% and UK Green Investment Bank holds 10%.

With 160 turbines of 3.6MW Siemens SWT-3.6-107, Gwynt y Môr will be Wales' largest wind farm. The output of 1,950 GWh per year is capable of powering around 400,000 homes, or 30% of the homes in Wales. This prevents the release of about 1.7 million tonnes of carbon dioxide every year.

Planning consent for the project was granted on 3 December 2008. The project has a value of 2 billion Euros. 1.2 billion Euros will go to Siemens for turbines and electrical connections.

Two floating experimental LIDAR wind measurement stations have been tested at the site for two years.

Construction
Construction work began offshore in January 2011 when pieces of rock were laid on softer parts of the seabed to secure the foundations of the turbines. Work began on laying undersea cables from the windfarm to the shore in August 2012. The project uses four 132 kV subsea cables manufactured by NKT. In order to feed electricity into the national grid, a substation was built near St Asaph in Denbighshire.

Power production started in September 2013. Final commissioning was completed on 18 June 2015.

Its levelised cost has been estimated at £179/MWh.

See also

 Wind power in the United Kingdom
List of offshore wind farms
List of offshore wind farms in the United Kingdom
List of offshore wind farms in the Irish Sea
 npower (UK)

References

External links
Gwynt y Môr , RWE Innogy

Offshore wind farms in the Irish Sea
Wind farms in Wales
RWE
Round 2 offshore wind farms
2015 establishments in Wales
Energy infrastructure completed in 2015